XHCLI-FM is a radio station on 98.5 FM in Culiacán, Sinaloa. It is owned by Grupo ACIR and carries its La Comadre grupera format.

History
XHCLI received its concession on December 4, 1992. It was owned by María de Lourdes Palacios Andrade.

References

Radio stations in Sinaloa
Grupo ACIR
Radio stations established in 1992